Eneriko Buliruarua (born 23 January 1997 in Vaturova, Fiji) is a Fijian rugby union player who plays for  in the Top 14. His playing position is centre or wing. He made his debut for Fiji in 2021 against .

Reference list

External links
itsrugby.co.uk profile

1997 births
Fijian rugby union players
Fiji international rugby union players
Living people
Rugby union centres
Rugby union wings
RC Toulonnais players
CA Brive players
Stade Rochelais players